Johann Anderson (also Juhan Anderson; 11 March 1905 Sindi, Russian Empire – ?) was an Estonian politician. He was a member of I Riigikogu. He was a member of the assembly since 26 October 1921. He replaced Paul Abramson. On 11 November 1921, he resigned his position and he was replaced by Voldemar Oras.

References

1905 births
Year of death missing
People from Tori Parish
People from Kreis Pernau
Estonian Independent Socialist Workers' Party politicians
Members of the Riigikogu, 1920–1923